Candace Valenzuela (born 1984) is an American politician from the state of Texas. She is a regional administrator for the United States Department of Housing and Urban Development.

Early life and education 
Valenzuela was born in 1984 to a Mexican-American mother and an African-American father in El Paso, Texas. Her parents served in the United States Armed Forces. As they weren't married, her mother, Mary Valenzuela, was not allowed to include her father on the birth certificate, and she gave her daughter her surname. Candace's parents married at Fort Hood, but divorced two years later.

After her mother left the military, the family lost their home. They stayed with her grandparents, with a Mormon family, and at a homeless shelter. At times when they had no place to stay, she slept behind a convenience store.

Valenzuela earned a full scholarship to Claremont McKenna College, where she earned a Bachelor of Arts in government.

Career 
In 2017, Valenzuela was elected to the school board for Carrollton-Farmers Branch Independent School District, defeating an 18 year incumbent. She resigned in December 2019.

Marchant announced he would not seek reelection in August 2019. In the primary election, Valenzuela and Kim Olson advanced to a runoff election. Valenzuela defeated Olson in the runoff, and faced Beth Van Duyne in the November general election. Van Duyne defeated Valenzuela in the general election.

In March 2022, President Joe Biden appointed Valenzuela as the regional administrator for the United States Department of Housing and Urban Development (HUD), overseeing Texas, Oklahoma, New Mexico, Louisiana, and Arkansas; this is the same position held by Van Duyne during the Trump administration.

Personal life 
Valenzuela and her husband, Andy, have two children. They live in Dallas, Texas.

References

External links

Living people
1984 births
Politicians from El Paso, Texas
Claremont McKenna College alumni
School board members in Texas
Biden administration personnel
United States Department of Housing and Urban Development officials
Women in Texas politics
Hispanic and Latino American women in politics